Sampson Lake is a lake located west of Sled Harbor, New York. Fish species present in the lake are brook trout, white sucker, and black bullhead. There is trail access on the northeast shore from Whitney Lake. No motors are allowed on this lake.

References

Lakes of Hamilton County, New York